Paul Francois Guay (born September 2, 1963 in Providence, Rhode Island) is a retired American professional ice hockey player. He is now an assistant coach for his high school's hockey team and is a captain in the Pawtucket Fire Department. He was inducted into the Rhode Island Hockey Hall of Fame in 2020.

Amateur career
Guay played high school hockey at Mount Saint Charles Academy, which has been known to boost many players up to the NHL.

While at Providence College, Guay set the school's record for number of goals in a single-season by scoring 34 in 1982–1983.

Paul played for the 1984 US Olympic team and scored one goal with the team.

Professional career
Guay was drafted by the Minnesota North Stars in the 1981 NHL Entry Draft.  He made his NHL debut with the Philadelphia Flyers in the 1983–1984 season.  Paul would go on to play 117 games in the NHL for the Flyers, Los Angeles Kings, Boston Bruins, and New York Islanders.

Career statistics

Regular season and playoffs

International

Awards and honors

References

External links
 

1963 births
American men's ice hockey right wingers
Boston Bruins players
Capital District Islanders players
Hershey Bears players
Ice hockey people from Providence, Rhode Island
Ice hockey players at the 1984 Winter Olympics
Living people
Los Angeles Kings players
Maine Mariners players
Milwaukee Admirals players
Minnesota North Stars draft picks
New Haven Nighthawks players
New York Islanders players
Olympic ice hockey players of the United States
Philadelphia Flyers players
Providence Friars men's ice hockey players
St. Louis Blues scouts
Springfield Indians players
Utica Devils players
Vancouver Canucks scouts
Mount Saint Charles Academy alumni